The Shorttail snake eel (Callechelys guineensis) is an eel in the family Ophichthidae (worm/snake eels). It was described by Balthazar Osório in 1893, originally under the genus Ophichthys. It is a marine, tropical eel which is known from the western and eastern Atlantic Ocean, including Florida, USA, Puerto Rico, Venezuela, the Bahamas, Saint Barthélemy, Senegal, Lesser Antilles, and Cape Verde.

References

Ophichthidae
Fish described in 1893